Eira is a former municipality in Messenia, Peloponnese, Greece. Since the 2011 local government reform it is part of the municipality Oichalia, of which it is a municipal unit. The municipal unit has an area of 86.654 km2. Population 433 (2011). The seat of the municipality was in Neda.

References

Populated places in Messenia